The  are the first three imperial anthologies of Japanese waka poetry. The Sandaishū provided both the language and organizational principles for the rest of the anthologies thereafter.  They are:
 Kokin Wakashū
 Gosen Wakashū
 Shūi Wakashū

Japanese poetry anthologies